The Comanche Peak Wilderness is a U.S. Wilderness Area located in the Roosevelt National Forest on the Canyon Lakes Ranger District in Colorado along the northern boundary of Rocky Mountain National Park. The  wilderness named for its most prominent peak was established in 1980. Roosevelt National Forest and Rocky Mountain National Park officially maintain 19 trails within the Wilderness, 5 of which pass into Rocky Mountain National Park. There are also 7 named peaks, 6 named lakes (including Comanche Reservoir) and 16 named rivers and creeks within the wilderness boundaries.

References

Protected areas of Larimer County, Colorado
Wilderness areas of Colorado
Protected areas established in 1980
Roosevelt National Forest